The 1998–99 FIS Cross-Country World Cup was the 18th official World Cup season in cross-country skiing for men and women. The season began in Muonio, Finland on 28 November 1998 and finished at Holmenkollen, Oslo, Norway on 20 March 1999. Bjørn Dæhlie of Norway won the overall men's cup. Bente Martinsen of Norway won the women's cup on more victories than Stefania Belmondo of Italy after both finished the season achieving 768 points.

The 1998–99 season was the last season the results from World Championships counted in the overall World Cup standings.

Calendar

Men 

Note: Until 1999 World Championships, World Championship races are part of the World Cup. Hence results from those races are included in the World Cup overall.

Women 

Note: Until 1999 World Championships, World Championship races are part of the World Cup. Hence results from those races are included in the World Cup overall.

Men's team

Women's team

Men's standings

Overall

Long Distance

Sprint

Women's standings

Overall

Long Distance

Sprint 

Note:  : When the season ended, Bente Martinsen and Stefania Belmondo were equal on points. Bente Martinsen won the Overall World Cup on most victories (Martinsen 7-2 Belmondo).

Achievements
Victories in this World Cup (all-time number of victories as of 1998/99 season in parentheses)

Men
 , 5 (46) first places
 , 4 (8) first places
 , 2 (3) first places
 , 2 (2) first places
 , 1 (5) first places
 , 1 (1) first place
 , 1 (1) first place
 , 1 (1) first place
 , 1 (1) first place
 , 1 (1) first place

Women
 , 7 (10) first places
 , 3 (15) first places
 , 2 (19) first places
 , 2 (3) first places
 , 1 (4) first place
 , 1 (2) first place
 , 1 (1) first place
 , 1 (1) first place
 , 1 (1) first place

References

FIS Cross-Country World Cup seasons
World Cup 1998-99
World Cup 1998-99